East Midlands derby may refer to:

Derby County F.C.–Leicester City F.C. rivalry
Derby County F.C.–Nottingham Forest F.C. rivalry
Leicester City F.C.–Nottingham Forest F.C. rivalry